West Virginia Route 279 is an east-west highway within the state of West Virginia. Its western terminus is at County Route 707, which leads to WV 131. Its eastern terminus is an interchange with US 50.

From east to west, the highway passes north of North Central West Virginia Airport before traveling through the Charles Pointe mixed-use master planned community.  After intersecting Interstate 79, Route 279 passes near United Hospital Center, and its western terminus continues on to the FBI Criminal Justice Information Services Division campus.

Major intersections

References

279
Transportation in Harrison County, West Virginia